Kohtumine Albertiga (Meeting Albert) is a limited edition box set by Estonian rock musician Urmas Alender, containing the upcoming albums Kohtumine Albertiga and Armastuse ämblik, which are mostly re-releases of Vana kloun and Hingelind. The set contains a booklet bound like a book and two digipak CD-s, while the separate releases have normal booklets and plastic covers.

Track listing

Kohtumine Albertiga
 "Varjude revolutsioon" (Revolution of shadows) (Urmas Alender/Urmas Alender) - 4:14 (performed by Andromeeda)
 "Sel poisil oli raske" (That boy had it hard) (Urmas Alender/Jüri Üdi) - 3:47 (performed by Varjud)
 "Teravik on suunatud alla" (The [sharp] point has been aimed downwards) (Kuusik, Sagadi, Kerstenbeck, Alender/Alender) - 4:57 (performed by Teravik)
 "Vana kloun" (Old clown) (Urmas Alender/Urmas Alender) - 3:57
 "Kadunud poeg" (Lost son) (Urmas Alender/A. Valgma) - 4:15
 "Korralik pere" (A decent family) (Urmas Alender/Jüri Üdi) - 3:45
 "Laul sügavast düünist" (Song about a deep dune) (Urmas Alender/Jüri Üdi) - 3:10
 "Oma saar" (Own island) (Urmas Alender/Gustav Suits) - 2:25
 "Võta mind lehtede varju!" (Take me under the cover of leaves!) (Urmas Alender/Viivi Luik) - 2:20
 "Suur rõõm ja väike mure" (Big joy and a small concern) (Urmas Alender/Ott Arder) - 2:13
 "Meelelahutus" (Entertainment) (Urmas Alender/Ott Arder) - 2:01
 "Juuspeened keeled" (Hair-thin strings) (Urmas Alender/Ott Arder) - 3:37
 "Kohtumine Albertiga" (Meeting Albert) (Urmas Alender/Ott Arder) - 2:19
 "Lauluke" (Ditty) (Urmas Alender/Ott Arder) - 3:06
 "Imelapse lapsepõlv" (The childhood of a wonder kid) (Urmas Alender/Ott Arder) - 2:55
 "Kõik läheb mööda" (Everything will pass) (Tiit Aunaste/Urmas Alender) - 5:06 (performed by Data)
 "Kui kaua?" (For how long?) (Tiit Aunaste/Urmas Alender) - 6:16 (performed by Data)
 "Tuumavaba Eesti" (Nuclear-free Estonia) (Urmas Alender/Urmas Alender) - 3:09 (performed by Data)
 "Taevased ratsamehed" (Heavenly horsemen) (Igor Garšnek/Urmas Alender) - 3:29 (performed by Data)
 "Hoia mind nii" (Hold me like this) (Tiit Aunaste/Urmas Alender) - 5:45 (performed by Data)

Armastuse ämblik
 "Paaria" (Pariah) (Urmas Alender/Heiti Talvik) - 1:12
 "Laupäev naisega" (Saturday with the woman) (Urmas Alender/Jüri Üdi) - 3:14
 "Sina pikajuukseline!" (You long-haired!) (Urmas Alender/Rudolf Rimmel) - 1:35
 "Kevade" (Spring) (Urmas Alender/Marje Teslon) - 2:58
 "Kui kaua veel" (How much longer) (Urmas Alender/Urmas Alender) - 3:34
 "Öine vahetus" (Night shift) (Urmas Alender/Ott Arder) - 3:06
 "On kui kevad" (As it's spring) (Urmas Alender/Virve Osila) - 2:54
 "Sa ütlesid: näkku ei lööda" (You said: no hitting in the face) (Urmas Alender/Virve Osila) - 2:16
 "Solaarne" (Solar) (Urmas Alender/Virve Osila) - 3:03
 "Suvenukrus" (Summer sadness) (Urmas Alender/Virve Osila) - 2:17
 "Kohtumine" (Meeting) (Urmas Alender/Virve Osila) - 2:25
 "Mereigatsus" (Sea yearning) (Urmas Alender/Virve Osila) - 2:46
 "Unenägu" (A dream) (Urmas Alender/Virve Osila) - 1:15
 "Vihmane ja talvekauge" (Rainy and winter distant) (Urmas Alender/Virve Osila) - 5:25
 "Neoonist silmad külmas kivilinnas" (Neon eyes in a cold stone city) (Urmas Alender/Virve Osila) - 2:11
 "Lummus" (Enchanted) (Urmas Alender/Virve Osila) - 3:00
 "Lootuses" (In hope) (Urmas Alender/Virve Osila) - 2:21
 "Elame veel" (We live more) (Urmas Alender/Virve Osila) - 2:36
 "Mõtisklus" (Contemplation) (Gennadi Podelski/Heldur Karmo) - 1:45
 "Metsluiged (Vennad luiged)" (Wild swans (Brothers swans)) (Rene Eespere/Leelo Tungal) - 3:29

2003 compilation albums
Urmas Alender albums
Estonian-language albums